Hérard is both a given name and a surname. Notable people with the name include:

Hérard Abraham (born 1940), former Haitian political figure
Hérard Dumesle (1784–1858), Haitian poet and politician
Schnider Hérard (born 1996), Haitian basketball player

See also
Charles Rivière-Hérard (1789–1850), officer in the Haitian Army under Alexandre Pétion
Denis Herard, politician from Alberta, Canada